Rosice is a town in Brno-Country District in the South Moravian Region of the Czech Republic. It has about 6,500 inhabitants.

Geography
It lies in the Boskovice Furrow. The Bobrava River flows through the town.

History
The first written mention of Rosice is from 1259. The most prominent owners of the manor were the Zierotins, who acquired it in 1562 and built a castle here. In 1907, Rosice was promoted to a town by Franz Joseph I of Austria.

Demographics

Sport
The local football club FC Slovan Rosice plays in the Moravian-Silesian Football League (3rd tier of the Czech football league system).

Sights

Rosice Castle is the main sight in the town. It was built in the Renaissance style in 1570–1579 and replaced an old medieval fortress from the 13th century. It is surrounded by a large castle park. Nowadays part of the castle is open to the public and part of it houses a library or a cultural centre.

The parish Church of Saint Martin is the oldest monument in Rosice. The Romanesque windows in its -high tower indicate that the building dates probably from the 12th century. It was rebuilt several times. It has one Gothic and one Renaissance chapel. The interior has its current look since the 18th century.

Notable people
Zdeněk Bobrovský (1933–2014), basketball player
Jan Bobrovský (born 1945), basketball player and coach
Ladislav Krejčí (born 1999), footballer

Twin towns – sister cities

Rosice is twinned with:
 Lainate, Italy
 Rimóc, Hungary
 Strenči, Latvia

References

External links

Cities and towns in the Czech Republic
Populated places in Brno-Country District